Khaled Omar Harrah (died 11 August 2016) was a Syrian man who volunteered for the Syrian Civil Defense Force, known as the White Helmets, an organization dedicated to providing humanitarian assistance.

He was a painter and decorator when the war in Syria broke out. He rose to international fame in June 2014 after he rescued a baby trapped in a building destroyed after an air strike in Aleppo, an act which gave him the nickname "the hero of Aleppo". The rescue was caught on video and viewed around the world.

The documentary film director Feras Fayyad dedicated his 2017 documentary Last Men in Aleppo, which chronicles the search-and-rescue missions of Aleppo's White Helmets, to him.

At age 31, August 11, 2016, he was killed in an airstrike, leaving behind a wife and two daughters. 
In 2017 Politico listed him as one of the 28 people "shaping, shaking and stirring Europe".

References

External links
Khaled Omar Harrah, 2014, Aleppo

2016 deaths
People of the Syrian civil war
Deaths by airstrike during the Syrian civil war
1985 births